Auckland Central is a New Zealand electoral division returning one member to the New Zealand House of Representatives. The electorate is currently represented by Chlöe Swarbrick, a member of the Green Party; she has represented the seat since 2020.

Population centres
In the 1887 electoral redistribution, although the Representation Commission was required through the Representation Act 1887 to maintain existing electorates "as far as possible", rapid population growth in the North Island required the transfer of three seats from the South Island to the north. Ten new electorates were created, including Auckland Central, and one former electorate was recreated.

Auckland Central contains Auckland city centre, the suburbs of Ponsonby, Westmere, Arch Hill, Herne Bay, Freemans Bay, St Mary's Bay, Newton and Eden Terrace at the west side of the city. Because of the location of the main Auckland ferry terminal, Auckland Central also contains the islands of the Hauraki Gulf. At the 2008 election, Grafton became part of Epsom, and Point Chevalier moved into Mount Albert. To offset these changes, the suburb of Newton was drafted in from Mount Albert. Further population growth ahead of the 2014 election resulted in Westmere and Grey Lynn transferring to Mount Albert.

History
Auckland Central was created ahead of the 1887 election; it was carved from parts of the electorates of Auckland North and the Auckland West and focused around upper Queen Street, Grafton, and Newton. It lasted only until the 1890 elections, when a reduction in the number of electorates meant Auckland Central was re-incorporated into a larger City of Auckland electorate. At the 1905 elections, the Auckland seat was split into three seats, including a recreated Auckland Central.

The seat has been held by the Labour Party for most of its existence: between 1919 and 2008, the seat had spent only three years in the hands of another party (the left-wing Alliance, from 1993 to 1996). However, the 2008 election saw Nikki Kaye win the seat for the National Party for the first time. Kaye retained the seat in 2011, 2014 and 2017, although with a reduced majority making Auckland Central one of the most marginal electorates in the country. She retired at the 2020 election, which saw Green Party candidate Chlöe Swarbrick win the seat in a tight three-way contest and become only the second Green electorate MP.

Members of Parliament

Unless otherwise stated, all MPs terms began and ended at general elections.

Key

List MPs
Members of Parliament elected from party lists in elections where that person also unsuccessfully contested the Auckland Central electorate. Unless otherwise stated, all MPs terms began and ended at general elections.

Key

Election results

2020 election

2017 election

2014 election

2011 election

2008 election

2005 election

2002 election

1999 election

1996 election

1993 election

1990 election

1987 election

1984 election

1981 election

1978 election

1975 election

1972 election

1969 election

1966 election

1963 election

1960 election

1957 election

1954 election

1951 election

1949 election

1946 election

1943 election

1938 election

1935 election

 
 
 
 
 
 
 
 
 

Table footnotes:

1931 election

1928 election

1925 election

1914 election

1911 election

1908 election

1905 election

1887 election

Table footnotes

References

Bibliography

External links
 Parliament of New Zealand – Auckland Central Electorate Profile

New Zealand electorates in the Auckland Region
1887 establishments in New Zealand
1905 establishments in New Zealand
1890 disestablishments in New Zealand